Sergei Anatolievich Kharin (born February 20, 1963) is a Russian former professional ice hockey player.

Playing career
He played briefly in the National Hockey League and the Soviet Hockey League, for the Winnipeg Jets and Krylia Sovetov Moscow. He was the first Soviet born player to play a regular season game for the Jets.  He also played on the Soviet Union's 1987 Canada Cup team, as well as for the Muskegon Fury in the United Hockey League.

Coaching career
On January 22, 2016, Kharin was named the Director of Hockey Operations for the Flint Firebirds of the Ontario Hockey League (OHL). Following the firing of former head coach John Gruden on February 17, 2016, Kharin was named the interim head coach of the Firebirds. The next day, OHL commissioner David Branch suspended the Firebirds' owner Rolf Nilsen and his appointees on the management and coaching staff, including Kharin, from hockey operations until further notice.

Personal
Sergei's son Anton played for three years at Rochester Institute of Technology before joining the Muskegon Lumberjacks of the International Hockey League in 2009.  Sergei, who played for the Muskegon team when it was known as the Fury, came out of retirement to play one more game on April 10, 2009, sharing a forward line with his son on the Lumberjacks. They became the first father and son to skate together in the IHL.

Career statistics

Regular season and playoffs

International

References

External links

1963 births
Living people
Birmingham Bulls (ECHL) players
Cincinnati Cyclones (IHL) players
Dayton Bombers players
Flint Firebirds coaches
Halifax Citadels players
Ice hockey people from Moscow
Krylya Sovetov Moscow players
Moncton Hawks players
Muskegon Fury players
Port Huron Border Cats players
Russian ice hockey right wingers
Soviet ice hockey right wingers
Soviet expatriate ice hockey players
Soviet expatriate sportspeople in Canada
Winnipeg Jets (1979–1996) draft picks
Winnipeg Jets (1979–1996) players
Worcester IceCats players
Expatriate ice hockey players in Canada
Expatriate ice hockey players in the United States
Russian expatriate sportspeople in the United States
Russian expatriate sportspeople in Canada